The American Stakes is a Grade III American thoroughbred horse race for horses age three and older over a distance of one mile on the turf track held at Santa Anita Park in Arcadia, California in June.   The race currently offers a purse of $100,000.

History 

The event was inaugurated on Independence Day in 1938 as the American Handicap, when Bing Crosby's and Lindsay C. Howard's Argentine bred Ligorati set a new track record of 1:50 for the  miles feature on the dirt track before a crowd of 60,000 at Hollywood Park Racetrack. The event was regularly scheduled for many of its runnings on the Fourth of July holiday attracting massive crowds especially in the 1950s and 1960s.

In its early runnings, the event became a main preparatory event for the Hollywood Gold Cup. The event attracted many fine horses who went on to complete the double. These include Argentine bred Kayak II in 1939, the Irish bred Champion Noor in 1950, the 1948 Triple Crown champion Citation in 1951, Irish bred Royal Serenade in 1953, 1953 Kentucky Derby winner Swaps in 1956, Hillsdale in 1959,  Prove It in 1962, South African bred Colorado King in 1964, Native Diver in 1965.  In 1968 the event was moved to the turf track.   The Argentine bred Figonero in 1969 and in 1971 US Horse of the Year Ack Ack were able to complete the American Handicap–Hollywood Gold Cup double.

The race was not run in 1942 or 1943, due to Hollywood Park being closed. In 1949, the event was held at Santa Anita Park, due to a devastating fire at Hollywood Park on the night of May 5, 1949.

The South African import Colorado King equalled the then-current world record for  miles in winning the 1964 edition.

Two mares have won this event, Pink Pigeon in 1968 and Toussaud in 1993.

The event was run in divisions in 1969 and 1975.

The event was a Grade II from 1973 to 1987, gaining Grade I status for 1988 and 1989. The event was downgraded to Grade III in 2014.

In 2011, the distance was shortened to one mile from nine furlongs.

On the closing of Hollywood Park Racetrack in 2013 the event has been held at Santa Anita Park.

Records
Speed  record:
 1 mile: 1:32.26 –  Pee Wee Reese (2017) 
  miles: 1:45.60 – Clever Song (1987)

Margins:
 7 lengths - Pink Pigeon (1968)

Most wins by a jockey:
 8 - Bill Shoemaker (1954, 1963, 1970, 1971, 1972, 1976, 1980, 1981)

Most wins by a trainer:
 7 - Charles Whittingham (1967, 1970, 1971, 1972, 1976, 1980, 1981)

Most wins by an owner:
 3 - Charles S. Howard (1939, 1941, 1950)
 3 - Rex C. Ellsworth (1956, 1962, 1963)

Winners

Legend:

 
 

Notes:

† Filly or Mare

§ Ran as part of an entry

See also
 List of American and Canadian Graded races

External links
 Santa Anita Media Guide for 2019 Winter Meet
 2012 Hollywood Park Media Guide

References

Graded stakes races in the United States
Open mile category horse races
Turf races in the United States
Horse races in California
Santa Anita Park
Recurring sporting events established in 1938
1938 establishments in California
Grade 3 stakes races in the United States